The 1988 South American Under-16 Football Championship was the 3rd edition of the South American Under-17 Football Championship, a football competition for the under-16 national teams in South America organized by CONMEBOL. It was held in Ecuador from 15 to 30 October 1988.

Brazil were crowned champions, and together with Argentina and Colombia, which were the top three teams of this tournament, qualified for the 1989 FIFA U-16 World Championship in Scotland.

Teams

 
 (title holders)
 

 (hosts)

Squads

Venues
The venues were Estadio Olímpico, Ibarra, Cotacachi and Atuntaqui.

First stage
The top two teams in each group advanced to the final stage.

Tiebreakers
When teams finished level of points, the final rankings were determined according to:

 goal difference
 goals scored
 head-to-head result between tied teams (two teams only)
 drawing of lots

All times local, ECT (UTC−5).

Group A

Group B

Final stage
When teams finished level of points, the final rankings were determined according to the same criteria as the first stage, taking into account only matches in the final stage.

Winners

Qualified teams for FIFA U-16 World Championship
The following three teams from CONMEBOL qualified for the 1989 FIFA U-16 World Championship.

References

1988
International association football competitions hosted by Ecuador
1988 in South American football
1988 in Ecuadorian football
1988 in youth association football